Bob Degus is an American film director and producer. He is best known for producing such films as Pleasantville and A Man Apart. His directorial debut was with the film 9/Tenths in 2006.

Early life 
Bob Degus grew up in Rochester, New York. His family has worked for Eastman Kodak.

Career 
Degus has worked as a writer, director, cinematographer, editor, post-production supervisor, and Oxberry-animation cameraman.

He was the production executive on F. Gary Gray's feature-directorial debut film, Friday and worked with Gray again on Set It Off and A Man Apart. Degus produced Gary Ross' feature debut film Pleasantville, alongside Steven Soderbergh and John Kilik. This film was triple Academy Award nominated. In the summer of 2005, Degus produced the low-budget independent feature Graduation alongside Jane Sindell, Jason Blum, Robin Bradford, and Scott Hansen.

At New Line Cinema, Degus worked as a production executive. He oversaw the production of Austin Powers: International Man of Mystery, Trial and Error, and B*A*P*S. Also, Degus served as head of production at Chanticleer Films.

Degus directed the 2006 independent feature, 9/Tenths, starring Gabrielle Anwar and Henry Ian Cusick. He also directed and edited a 35mm short film, Another Round, that was invited to screen at the Los Angeles International Film Festival and was subsequently purchased by Showtime to air on their network.

He also produced and conceptualized Funk Blast, an attraction at Paul Allen's "Experience Music Project" Museum, in Seattle. Degus collaborated with James Brown, Maceo Parker, Bootsy Collins, George Clinton, Chaka Kahn, and Herbie Hancock, producing a 70mm film attraction.

Degus is an active, voting member of the Academy of Motion Picture Arts and Sciences. He serves on the Foreign Language Film Award Nominating Committee and is a member of the executive board for his branch.

Filmography 
He was a producer in all films unless otherwise noted.

Film

Miscellaneous crew

As director

Sound department

Thanks

Television

Miscellaneous crew

Production manager

As director

External links
Official Bob Degus Website

American film directors
American film producers
Year of birth missing (living people)
Living people